The Holland Tract is an island in the Sacramento–San Joaquin River Delta. It is part of Contra Costa County, California, and managed by Reclamation District 2025.

It appears on a 1952 United States Geological Survey map of the area.

References

Islands of Contra Costa County, California
Islands of the Sacramento–San Joaquin River Delta
Islands of Northern California